Alexander Wilcocks (17411801)  was born in Philadelphia. He was a lawyer and a supporter the American Revolutionary War. 

After his 1761 graduation from the College of Philadelphia (now the University of Pennsylvania) he became a lawyer. He married Mary, the daughter of Pennsylvania Chief Justice Benjamin Chew.

Wilcocks supported the American Revolution as a member of Philadelphia's committee of safety. After the Revolution, he served as recorder of Philadelphia from 1789 to 1791.
Wilcocks was elected a member of the American Philosophical Society in 1768 and served as a University of Pennsylvania trustee from 1779 until his death in 1801. He is buried at Saint Peter's Episcopal Church, in Philadelphia.

References

1747 births
1802 deaths
Lawyers from Philadelphia
People of colonial Pennsylvania
People of Pennsylvania in the American Revolution
Members of the American Philosophical Society
18th-century American people
Pennsylvania lawyers
University of Pennsylvania alumni